Shevi Waterfall is the largest natural waterfall in the Middle East. The geographical location of the waterfall is E484936 N324745, Zagros Mountains in a village called Shevi at Shahion district in Dezful City , Khuzestan Province.

The waterfall was registered on January 19, 2015 as one of the national monuments of Iran and the first national natural monument of Khuzestan Province.

Shevi Waterfall, which is located near Salon Mountains and is 65 km from the center of Shahion district and 110 km from Dezful City.

Description of the waterfall 
Coming out of a cave, the Shevi Waterfall flows down from a high gorge. The height of the waterfall is 85 meters, and its width is 70 meters. After crossing mountains and valleys, its water flows into the Dez River and finally into the Dez Dam Lake in Khuzestan Province. The vegetation around this waterfall is composed of trees such as willow, fig, vine, ash (European ash), maple, and oak.

Under the waterfall and on its walls, there are blackthorns and other hydrophilic plants. Near this waterfall, there is another large waterfall, which is sometimes called the second Shevi Waterfall.

References

Category

Waterfalls of Iran